Roger Chevalier is an American astronomer currently on faculty at University of Virginia. A cited expert in theoretical astrophysics, his interests include astronomical supernovae environment and gases.

Education
He earned his Ph.D. at Princeton University in 1973 and joined the Kitt Peak National Observatory until he started teaching at University of Virginia in 1979.

Honors and awards
 Elected to the National Academy of Sciences in 1996.
 Awarded the Dannie Heineman Prize for Astrophysics in 1996.
 Elected a Legacy Fellow of the American Astronomical Society in 2020

Publications
 The transition region and coronal explorer, Solar Physics, 1999
 Self-similar solutions for the interaction of stellar ejecta with an external medium, The Astrophysical Journal, 1982
 Wind from a starburst galaxy nucleus, RA Chevalier, Andrew W Clegg, Nature, 1985
 The evolution of supernova remnants. Spherically symmetric models, The Astrophysical Journal, 1974
 The radio and X-ray emission from type II supernovae, The Astrophysical Journal, 1982

References

Year of birth missing (living people)
Living people
University of Virginia faculty
American astronomers
Princeton University alumni
Fellows of the American Astronomical Society
Winners of the Dannie Heineman Prize for Astrophysics